Róbert Ilyés (born 4 February 1974) is a Romanian football manager and former player of Hungarian ethnicity who played as a midfielder. He is currently the assistant manager of Sepsi OSK.

Club career

Foresta Fălticeni
He started his professional career by joining Divzia B side Foresta Fălticeni in 1995. In his second season at the club he played a crucial role in winning the 1996–97 Divizia B title that also meant promotion to Divizia A. The club barely avoided relegation at the end of the 1997–98 Divizia A season and as the team stood last before the winter break of the 1998–99 Divizia A season he left midseason to the better rated Divzia A side Astra Ploiești.

Astra Ploiești
With his continued good performances as a box-to-box midfielder throughout the 3 seasons that he played for Astra, he drew the attention of bigger Bucharest clubs.

Rapid București
Rapid București manager Viorel Hizo signed him during the winter transfer window of the 2001–02 Divizia A. He enjoyed major success at the club, winning the 2001–02 Cupa României, 2002 Supercupa României, 2002–03 Divizia A and 2003 Supercupa României. Although he was vital to the team's success, he felt that his financial compensation was unfairly low compared to other teammates. He did not renew his contract in the winter of 2005.

Khazar Lankaran
During his one and a half-year spell at the club, he went on to win both the 2006–07 Azerbaijan Top League and 2006–07 Azerbaijan Cup with Khazar.

FC Brașov
He returned to Romania to Liga II side FC Brașov in July 2007. Being the team captain, he helped the side promote to Liga I by winning the 2007–08 Liga II. He spent the following 3 seasons playing for the club in Liga I.

Târgu Mureș
After one last Liga I season at FCM Târgu Mureș, he decided to retire as a player.

Later lower league games
After a brief assistant manager spell at FC Brașov, he returned to play football in the lower Romanian leagues as the player-manager of FK Csíkszereda. While being the assistant manager of Sepsi OSK, he made a few Liga III appearances for the club's reserve team. He scored his last Liga III goal on 9 October 2020 at the age of 46.

Managerial career
In 2013 he had a brief spell as the assistant manager of Liga I side FC Brașov. Later in 2013 he became player-manager at his hometown club FK Csíkszereda. He led the team to promotion from Liga IV to Liga III at the end of his first season but he struggled to obtain promotion to Liga II in the following 3 seasons. In 2017 he switched to coaching the youth team of the club and in 2018 he obtained the UEFA B Licence in Hungary. He left FK Csíkszereda for an assistant manager role at Liga I side Sepsi OSK in 2019.

International career
He was player-manager of the Székely Land squad that finished 3rd at the 2017 ConIFA European Football Cup and 4th at the 2018 ConIFA World Football Cup respectively.

Statistics

Honours

Club
Foresta Fălticeni
 Divizia B: 1996–97
Rapid București
 Divizia A: 2002–03
 Cupa României: 2001–02, 2005–06
 Supercupa României: 2002, 2003
 Khazar Lankaran
 Azerbaijan Top League: 2006–07
 Azerbaijan Cup: 2006–07
FC Brașov
 Liga II: 2007–08
Csíkszereda Miercurea Ciuc
Liga IV – Harghita County: 2013–14

International
Székely Land
CONIFA European Football Cup third place: 2017
CONIFA World Football Cup fourth place: 2018

References

External links
 

1974 births
Living people
Sportspeople from Miercurea Ciuc
Romanian people of Hungarian descent
Romanian sportspeople of Hungarian descent
Romanian footballers
Association football midfielders
Association football player-managers
Liga I players
FC Astra Giurgiu players
FC Rapid București players
FC Brașov (1936) players
ASA 2013 Târgu Mureș players
FK Csíkszereda Miercurea Ciuc players
Khazar Lankaran FK players
Expatriate footballers in Azerbaijan
Romanian expatriate sportspeople in Azerbaijan
Romanian football managers
Liga I managers
FK Csíkszereda Miercurea Ciuc managers
Sepsi OSK Sfântu Gheorghe managers